Circular Fashion is an application of circular economy to the fashion industry, where the life cycles of fashion products are extended. According to the definition of The European Parliament, this involves "sharing, leasing, reusing, repairing, refurbishing and recycling existing materials and products as long as possible." Pioneering work and terminology on circular fashion, reached the mainstream through a 2017 report by the Ellen MacArthur Foundation titled "A New Textile Economy: Redesigning Fashion's Future". So far, the EU has been the main proponent for developing frameworks around circular fashion on a policy level, such as the Circular Economy Action Plan, part of the European Commission's "EU strategy for sustainable and circular textiles," launched in March 2022.

References

Further reading 
 Can clothes ever be fully recycled?; BBC

Fashion industry
Environmental economics
Sustainable business